Indian Key Historic State Park is an island within the Florida State Park system, located just a few hundred yards southeast of U.S. 1 within the Florida Keys.  The island was home to the town of Indian Key, Florida in the middle of the 19th century but is now an uninhabited ghost town.  It is frequently visited by tourists and is the subject of an archaeological project to uncover the historic building foundations.

The park was listed on the National Register of Historic Places in 1972.

History
 See Indian Key, Florida

References

Buker, George E. (1975) Swamp Sailors: Riverine Warfare in the Everglades 1835-1842. Gainesville, Florida:The University Presses of Florida. .
Knetsch, Joe. (2003) Florida's Seminole Wars 1817-1858. Charleston, South Carolina: Arcadia Publishing. .
Viele, John. (1996) The Florida Keys: A History of the Pioneers. Sarasota, Florida: Pineapple Press, Inc. .
Viele, John. (2001) The Florida Keys: The Wreckers. Sarasota, Florida: Pineapple Press, Inc. .

External links
 History of Indian Key
 Indian Key Historic State Park at Florida State Parks
 Indian Key State Historic Site at Absolutely Florida
 Indian Key State Historic Site at Wildernet
 Indian Key - Florida Ghost Town

Bahamian-American culture in Florida
National Register of Historic Places in Monroe County, Florida
Archaeological sites in Monroe County, Florida
State parks of Florida
Parks in the Florida Keys
Seminole Wars
Tourist attractions in the Florida Keys
Protected areas established in 1972
Parks in Monroe County, Florida
Florida Native American Heritage Trail
Parks on the National Register of Historic Places in Florida
1972 establishments in Florida